Edhi Edhi Hoadheemey is a 2003 Maldivian film directed by Hussain Shafeeu. Produced by Rasheed under KMR Productions, the film stars Yoosuf Shafeeu, Mariyam Nisha and Ismail Rasheed in pivotal roles, marking Ismail Rasheed's debut performance in a feature film.

Premise
Thoyyib (Ismail Rasheed) casually sees a snippet of a beautiful and diffident girl, Meera (Mariyam Nisha) whom he falls in love to the point he loses his sanity. Thoyyib tries all the possible ways to attain Meera's attention and affection. However all his plans backfire on the night of Meera's birthday, where she agrees to start a romantic relationship with her childhood friend, Rashwan (Yoosuf Shafeeu). Thoyyib lives a depressive life and Meera feels her life remains incomplete even with Rashwan's presence. Meera requests Rashwan to fast track their marriage plans while Rashwan chooses to complete his university studies before marrying her. Desperately, seeking revenge from him, Meera asks Thoyyib to marry her though she does not love him.

Cast 
 Yoosuf Shafeeu as Rashwan
 Mariyam Nisha as Meera
 Ismail Rasheed as Thoyyib
 Chilhiya Moosa Manik as Ahammad; Meera's father
 Arifa Ibrahim as Latheefa; Meera's mother
 Aminath Ibrahim Didi as Thoyyib's mother
 Fauziyya Hassan as Dhon Aimina; Meera's grandmother
 Fathimath Mufliha as Malee
 Aishath Haleem as Shaahy; Meera's best-friend
 Sheereen Abdul Wahid as Naaz; Meera's friend
 Hussain Shibau as Niyaz
 Mohamed Shameem as Ali
 Shameema as Naaz's mother (Special appearance)
 Abdulla Naseer (Special appearance)
 Sithi Fulhu (Special appearance)

Soundtrack

Response
Upon release, the film received mainly positive reviews from critics. Hilath Rasheed reviewing from Haveeru Daily praised the "splendid" performance by Mariyam Nisha and also the moments of "pure artistry and sheer film-making brilliance" in the film. Acknowledging the attempt of directors for its revelation moment, he wrote: "directors tackle a subject which has and is still a pressing social problem but hardly discussed, at least not in typical Dhivehi films which is happy to package "love" as a "Mills & Boon" type of superficial feeling". Criticizing the "oversimplified" climax, he noted that "Rasheed's natural comedic movements and gestures, coupled with a script full of humour, makes the lengthy scenes more tolerable".

Accolades

References

Maldivian films
2006 films